Kenneth Foster may refer to:

Kenneth Foster (criminal) (born 1976), American prisoner
Kenneth Foster (figure skater) (born 1951), British figure skater
Kenneth Foster (politician) (1866–1930), British politician

See also
Kenny Foster (born 1985), American mixed martial artist